Rudolf Tayerlé (1877–1942) was a Czechoslovak Social Democratic politician and trade union leader. In 1922 he was instrumental in expelling the communists from the Odborové sdružení českoslovanské. In 1942 he was elected vice-president of the International Federation of Trade Unions. Tayerlé was arrested shortly after the German invasion of Czechoslovakia. He died in the Mauthausen-Gusen concentration camp.

References

1877 births
1942 deaths
Czechoslovak trade unionists
Czechoslovak politicians
People who died in Mauthausen concentration camp
Czech Social Democratic Party politicians
Politicians who died in Nazi concentration camps
Czechoslovak civilians killed in World War II